Sufi saints or Wali (plural ʾawliyāʾ أولياء) played an instrumental role in spreading Islam throughout the world. In the traditional Islamic view, a saint is portrayed as someone "marked by [special] divine favor ... [and] holiness",  and who is specifically "chosen by God and endowed with exceptional gifts, such as the ability to work miracles."

List

A

B
 Baba Fakruddin (1169–1295, buried in Penukonda)
 Baba Kuhi of Shiraz (948-1037)
 Baba Shadi Shaheed (17th century, first Chib Rajput to convert to Islam, married a daughter of Babur)
 Sheikh Bedreddin (1359–1420, buried in Istanbul in 1961, revolted against Mehmed I)
 Baha' al-Din Naqshband (1318–1389, buried in Bukhara, founder of the Naqshbandi order)
 Balım Sultan (d. 1517/1519, buried in Nevşehir Province, co-founder of the Bektashi Order)
 Bahauddin Zakariya (1170–1267, buried in the Shrine of Bahauddin Zakariya, spread the Suhrawardiyya order through South Asia)
 Bande Nawaz (1321–1422, buried in Gulbarga, spread the Chishti Order to southern India)
 Khwaja Baqi Billah (1564–1605, buried in Delhi, spread the Naqshbandi order into India)
 Bawa Muhaiyaddeen (d. 1986, founder of the Bawa Muhaiyaddeen Fellowship in Philadelphia)
 Bayazid Bastami (874/5-848/9, buried in Shrine of Bayazid Bostami, noted for his ideas on spiritual intoxication)
 Bibi Jamal Khatun (d. 1639 or 1647, lived in Sehwan Sharif, sister of Mian Mir)
 Bodla Bahar (1238-1298, buried in Sehwan Sharif, features in the miracle stories of Lal Shahbaz Qalandar)
 Bu Ali Shah Qalandar (1209–1324, buried in Panipat)
 Bulleh Shah (1680–1757, buried in Kasur, regarded as "the father of Punjabi enlightenment")

D
 Dara Shikoh (1615–1659, brother of Aurangzeb, author of Majma-ul-Bahrain)
 Daud Bandagi Kirmani (1513–1575, buried in Shergarh, Punjab)
 Dawūd al-Qayṣarī
 Dawud Tai (d. circa 777-782)
 Dhul-Nun al-Misri

F
 Fakhr ad-Din ar-Razi
 Fariduddin Ganjshakar (1188–1280, buried in the Shrine of Baba Farid, Pakpattan, Pakistan and developed Punjabi literature through poetry)
 Fazl Ahmad Khan (1857–1907), Indian Sufi teacher
 Fuzuli (1494–1556), considered one of the greatest poets of Azerbaijani literature)
 Imam Fassi

G
 Ghulam Ali Dehlavi (1743–1824, buried in Delhi)
 Ghulam Farid (1845–1901), buried in Mithankot, poet
 Ghousi Shah (1893–1954, buried in Hyderabad)
 Gül Baba (d. 1541, buried in Tomb of Gül Baba, esoteric author and patron saint of Budapest)

H
 Hafez (1315-1390, buried in Tomb of Hafez, highly popular antinomian Persian poet whose works are regularly quoted and even used for divination)
 Haji Huud (1025–1141, buried in Patan, Gujarat, helped spread Islam in India)
 Haji Bayram Veli (1352–1430, buried in Ankara, founder of the Bayramiye order)
 Haji Bektash Veli (1209–1271, buried in the Haji Bektash Veli Complex, revered by both Alevis and Bektashis)
 Hasan al-Basri (642-728, buried in Az Zubayr, highly important figure in the development of Sunni Sufism)
 Hazrat Babajan (d. 1931, buried in Pune, master to Meher Baba)
 Hayreddin Tokadi
 Yusuf Hamdani (1062-1141, buried in Merv)
 Mir Sayyid Ali Hamadani (1314–1384, buried in Khatlon Region, spread the Kubrawiya order throughout Asia)
 Hüsn ü Aşk
 Usman Harooni
 Ali Hujwiri

I
 Iraqī (1213–1289)
 Ibrahim Niass
 Ibrahim ibn Adham
 Ibn Arabi
 Ibn Ata Allah
 Imam Ali-ul-Haq (925-971, buried in Sialkot).
 Ibrahim al-Dasuqi (1255–1296, buried in Desouk, founder of the Desouki order)
 İbrahim Hakkı Erzurumi (1703–1780, buried in Tillo, astronomer and encyclopedist, first Muslim author to cover post-Copernican astronomy)
 Ibrahim ibn Faïd (1396-1453)
 Imadaddin Nasimi
 Ismail Haqqi Bursevi (1653-1725, buried in Bursa, author noted for esoteric interpretations of the Quran)
 Ismail Qureshi al Hashmi (1260–1349)

J
 Jalaluddin Surkh-Posh Bukhari (1192–1291)
 Jamal-ud-Din Hansvi
 Jabir ibn Hayyan
 Ja'far al-Sadiq
 Jahanara Begum Sahib (1614–1681)
 Jahaniyan Jahangasht (1308–1384)
 Jamī

K

M

 Muhammad Fawzi Al-Karkari 
  محمد فوزي الكركري 

(1974),Sceau des Saints, Revificateur du 21eme siècle

N

O
 Omar Khayyam
 Osman Fazli
 Otman Baba

P
 Pir Baba (1431-1502)
 Pir Sultan
 Pir Yemeni
 Muhammad Alauddin Siddiqui from Nerian Sharif Azad Kashmir Pakistan (1936-2017)

Q
 Qasim ibn Muhammad ibn Abi Bakr
 Qutb ad-Dīn Haydar
 Qutb al-Din al-Shirazi
 Qutbuddin Bakhtiar Kaki (1173–1235)

R
 Ahmad Sirhindi (aka Imam Rabbani) (ca. 1564-1624)
 Rabia Basri
 Rahman Baba
 Ahmed al-Rifa'i
 Rukn-e-Alam (1251–1335)
 Rumi

S

T
 Tajuddin Muhammad Badruddin 
 Telli Baba

U
 Üftade

W
 Waris Shah 
 Waris Ali Shah

Y
 Yahya bey Dukagjini
 Yahya Efendi
 Makhdoom Yahya Maneri (1263–1381)
 Khwaja Yunus Ali
 Yunus Emre
 Youza Asouph

Z
 Zahed Gilani

See also 
Sufism
Islam in India
 List of Sufis
 Sufism in India

References

 
Sufi saints
Sufi saints
Muslim saints
Medieval Islamic world-related lists